The Tatar Autonomous Soviet Socialist Republic, abbreviated as Tatar ASSR or TASSR (1920–1990), was an autonomous republic of the Russian SFSR. The resolution for its creation was signed on 27 May 1920 and the republic was proclaimed on 25 June 1920. Kazan served as its capital.

The territory of the TASSR was a part of Kazan, Simbirsk, and Ufa Governorates (guberniyas) of the Imperial Russia before the October Revolution of 1917.
1920: Tatar Autonomous Soviet Socialist Republic
1990: Tatar Soviet Socialist Republic
1992: Republic of Tatarstan

Notable people
Gabdulkhay Akhatov – professor and Turkologist
Sofia Gubaidulina – composer
Chulpan Khamatova – film, theater and TV actress
Mintimer Shaimiev – politician, the first secretary of the Tatar Regional Committee of the CPSU
Boris Yeltsin – first Russian president (1991–1999)
Ravil Maganov – chairman of Lukoil (2020–2022)
Valery Gerasimov – Incumbent Russian Chief of General Staff

See also
1921–1922 famine in Tatarstan
Communist Party of the Republic of Tatarstan
First Secretary of the Tatarstan Communist Party

References

Autonomous republics of the Russian Soviet Federative Socialist Republic
History of Tatarstan
States and territories established in 1920
Former socialist republics